Richmond Park is a Welsh Premier League stadium in Carmarthen, Wales. Situated on Priory Street, it is currently used for football matches and is the home ground of Carmarthen Town AFC.

The stadium holds 3,000 people with 1,000 seats in the Clay Shaw Butler stand. The stand is arranged with 1,000 yellow and black seats in rows, matching the colour of the home team's kit.

History 

The club announced they would be installing a 3G all-weather pitch for the 2017/18 season. Carmarthen Town began the season with a number of games away from their Richmond Park home due these pitch renovations. With the new pitch the 'Old Gold' joined a growing list of Welsh Premier League clubs to install a 3G/4G pitch.

Richmond Park has been used for a number of International football matches. The majority of these have featured Wales national football team sides. The first match was against Scotland on 20 May 2003 which ended in a 2–1 victory for Wales.

Records 
The highest attendance recorded at Richmond Park is 911, for Carmarthen's League of Wales match against Barry Town, on 10 September 1997.

The stadium hosted its first European football match in July 2007 when Carmarthen Town entertained Norwegian side SK Brann in a UEFA Cup qualification match.

Transport 

Richmond Park is located to the north east of Carmarthen town centre and is easily accessible on foot, by road or by rail. Directly adjacent to the ground, on either side, are two public car parks; St Peter's car park has 435 parking spaces and Priory Street car park (situated next to the club house) has 53 spaces.

Gallery

See also 
List of stadia in Wales by capacity

References 
Citations

External links 
Richmond Park official website
Carmarthen Town AFC official website
Images tagged Richmond Park Carmarthen at Flickr

Carmarthen Town A.F.C.
Buildings and structures in Carmarthen
Football venues in Wales
Stadiums in Wales
Sports venues completed in 1952